JBJ was a South Korean boy band consisting of six members who previously participated in Mnet's 2017 survival show Produce 101 Season 2. The group was managed by Fave Entertainment, while CJ E&M oversaw the group's release production. They officially debuted on October 18, 2017. They held their final concert on April 22, 2018, and disbanded on April 30, 2018.

History

Pre-debut
Produce 101 Season 2 premiered on Mnet in April 2017, where 101 male trainees from various South Korean entertainment companies competed to debut in an 11-member boy group that would promote exclusively for a year and a half under YMC Entertainment. The show ended on June 16, forming the project group Wanna One. On the same day, the show's fans had named Kenta Takada of Star Road Entertainment, Jin Longguo of Choon Entertainment, Kim Sang-gyun of Hunus Entertainment, and Kim Tae-dong of The Vibe Label (later known as Major Nine), as eliminated trainees whom they would like to debut together as a project group equivalent to Produce 101'''s I.B.I. The fans tentatively named the group "JBJ", which stands for the Korean phrase 정말 바람직한 조합, meaning "A Really Desirable Combination", and "Just Be Joyful". Later on, Roh Tae-hyun of Ardor & Able (later known as Star Crew Entertainment), Kim Dong-han of Oui Entertainment, and Kwon Hyun-bin of YGKPlus were soon added into the fan-imagined group after the Instagram photo that Taehyun posted had received positive feedback from fans.

Discussions to officially form and debut JBJ began around early July 2017 between the seven tentative members and their respective agencies. CJ E&M and LOEN Entertainment also participated in the discussions as the intended management companies of the group's releases and activities, respectively. Fave Entertainment, LOEN Entertainment's in-house label, was tasked to be the group's official agency. On July 25, the trainees and the companies had reached an agreement. It was reported that the group's contract would last seven months, but LOEN Entertainment expressed that they are open for any discussions to extend the group's contract. JBJ was tentatively scheduled for debut on September 10 with all seven members, but was later confirmed for debut on October 18 without Kim Tae-dong.

Kim Tae-dong's participation in the group was not confirmed because of an ongoing conflict with his agency, The Vibe Label. On July 27, Kim Tae-dong had sent his agency certification of contents and requested for his contract be terminated. Since then, the involved parties, including CJ E&M and LOEN Entertainment, had numerous meetings to resolve the conflict but, as of September 7, had yet to reach an agreement. After more than a year of inactivity, during which he was unable to promote as an official member of JBJ, he has returned to the agency, now called Major 9 Entertainment.

Debut with Fantasy
The group's first reality show, Just be Joyful JBJ, began airing on September 27, 2017, on Mnet M2 Channel.

JBJ released their debut extended play Fantasy on October 18, 2017, with the title song "Fantasy". They also held a debut showcase at Korea University's Hwajung Gymnasium on the same day. On October 19, JBJ made their official debut stage on the music program M Countdown with performing title song "Fantasy" along with song "Say My Name".

On October 19, it was announced that JBJ would hold fan meetings all across Asia, starting in Japan (Tokyo and Osaka) on November 23 and 26 respectively.

On December 21, it was confirmed that JBJ's new album was set to be released in January 2018 and also announced that JBJ would hold their first solo concert titled JBJ 1st Concert [Really Desirable Concert] from February 3 to 4, 2018. The two-day concert was held in Olympic Park's Olympic Hall. It was reported that the 7,000 available tickets sold out in under a minute.

True Colors
On January 3, 2018, JBJ announced the new extended play titled True Colors and also revealed the tracklist of the EP, followed by six individual teaser image of each members over the next six days. One day later, four teaser images of the group's was revealed. Two days later, the music video teaser for the lead single "My Flower" was released and the EP spoiler video was released three days later.

Following by the release of True Colors on January 17, JBJ held a comeback showcase titled Joyful Colors in Yes24 Live Hall the same day.

On January 18, Fave Entertainment announced that JBJ's fanmeetings across Asia had been concluded and finished in the Philippines on January 14.

JBJ received their first music program trophy with "My Flower" on the January 26 episode of Music Bank.

 Possible contract extension 
Originally, JBJ was set to disband in April 2018. However, all six members expressed interest in extending their contracts, there had been discussion over a possible extension of their contracts. On February 22, Fave Entertainment and all of the members' agencies had officially been discussing the possibility of a contract extension until December 2018. On March 14, Fave Entertainment confirmed that JBJ's seven-month promotions would be concluded with the expiration of the management contract on April 30, as the companies decided not to extend the contracts. The members would still actively promote until the end of their contracts.

Last activities
On March 15, 2018, JBJ confirmed that they would be releasing their last single "New Moon" on April 17, and also announced plans to hold a domestic concert and fanmeeting before the official disbandment date of April 30. On March 19, JBJ announced details on the final solo concert, titled JBJ Really Desirable Concert [Epilogue], which would take place in Seoul from April 21 to 22, 2018, as an extension of their first concert Really Desirable Concert in February. The two-day concert was held in at the Olympic Handball Gymnasium.

JBJ released their final album New Moon on April 17. The album included three new tracks in addition to all the songs from Fantasy and True Colors.

On April 22, JBJ concluded their final concert JBJ Really Desirable Concert [Epilogue] as their last performance.

The group officially disbanded on April 30, 2018, following their contract expiration with Fave Entertainment.

Members
Adapted from their Naver profile.
 Roh Tae-hyun (former member of Hotshot)
 Kenta Takada (/, member of JBJ95)
 Kim Sang-gyun (former member of Topp Dogg, member of JBJ95)
 Jin Longguo (/, member of Longguo & Shihyun, now a soloist)
 Kwon Hyun-bin (known as VIINI, now a soloist, actor and model)
 Kim Dong-han (soloist, member of WEi)

Discography

Compilations

Extended plays

Singles

Other charted songs

 Filmography 
Television
 Produce 101 Season 2 (Mnet, 2017)
 Just Be Joyful (Mnet, 2017)

Concerts
Headlining

 Korea 
 JBJ 1st Concert [Really Desirable Concert] (2018)
 JBJ Really Desirable Concert [Epilogue] (2018)

 Japan 
 2018 JBJ Japan Tokyo Valentine Live Asia 
 JBJ 1st Concert [Joyful Days] (2018)
 Thailand (March 31, 2018)
 Indonesia (April 7, 2018)
 Japan
 Tokyo (April 10, 2018)
 Osaka (April 11 & 12, 2018)

Awards and nominations
Asia Artist Awards

|-
| rowspan="2"|2017
| rowspan="2"|JBJ
| Popularity Award
| 
|-
| Rising Star Award
| 

Gaon Chart Music Awards

|-
| 2018
| FANTASY''
| New Artist of the Year (Album)
|

Golden Disc Awards

|-
| rowspan="2"|2018
| rowspan="2"|JBJ
|New Artist of the Year
| 
|-
| Global Popularity Award
|

Korean Culture and Entertainment Awards

|-
|2017
| JBJ
| Kpop Singer Award
|

Seoul Music Awards

|-
| rowspan="3"|2018
| rowspan="3"|JBJ
|New Artist Award
| 
|-
|Popularity Award
| 
|-
|Hallyu Special Award
|

V Live Awards

|-
| 2018
|JBJ
|Global Rookie Top 5
|

Korean Entertainment Arts Awards

|-
|2018
| JBJ
| Best Rookie Group (Male)
|

Notes

References

K-pop music groups
Musical groups established in 2017
Kakao M artists
South Korean boy bands
South Korean dance music groups
South Korean pop music groups
Musical groups from Seoul
Produce 101
Produce 101 contestants
2017 establishments in South Korea